Kjartan Ólafsson may refer to

 Kjartan Ólafsson (composer) (born 1958), Icelandic musicologist, composer, and academic
 Kjartan Ólafsson, key historical character in Laxdæla saga